Kaye Fox (1942 – March 27, 2016), was an American transgender activist and priest.

In 1979, while working as a priest, prior to coming out as transgender, Fox guided the Open Door Mission in its greatest period of growth both financially and organizationally, supervising the opening of its Plymouth Avenue shelter in 1986. During that time the Mission grew from one to 40 employees, boasting an annual budget of $3.5 million. In 2002 she announced her female identity at which point her son Ron Fox took over her position at the Mission. She was admired by many LGBT activists and worshiped at one of the first churches to embrace members of the community – the Open Arms Metropolitan Community Church. According to local LGBT activist Anne Tischer, she helped many identifying as transgender become more comfortable spiritually.

References

1942 births
2016 deaths
Date of birth missing
Place of birth missing
Place of death missing
Transgender women
American priests